The 2017 Asian Wrestling Championships was held at the KD Jadhav Indoor Stadium, Indira Gandhi Arena, New Delhi in India. The event took place from 10 to 14 May 2017.

Medal table

Team ranking

Medal summary

Men's freestyle

Men's Greco-Roman

Women's freestyle

Participating nations 
255 competitors from 19 nations competed.

 (1)
 (22)
 (11)
 (24)
 (16)
 (24)
 (24)
 (17)
 (16)
 (9)
 (1)
 (2)
 (24)
 (10)
 (12)
 (10)
 (3)
 (24)
 (5)

References

External links
UWW

Asia
Asian Wrestling Championships
Wrestling
International wrestling competitions hosted by India
Asian Wrestling Championships